The Holy Trinity Cathedral  also called Greek-Catholic Cathedral of Athens is a Greek Byzantine Catholic cathedral in Athens, Greece.

It functions as the seat of the Greek Catholic Apostolic Exarchate of Greece (Exarchatus Apostolicus Graeciae) that was created on June 11, 1932 by the then Pope Pius XI, and follows the Byzantine Rite,

It is under the pastoral responsibility of Bishop Manuel Nin.

See also
Greek Byzantine Catholic Church
Roman Catholicism in Greece
Holy Trinity

References

Eastern Catholic cathedrals in Greece
Cathedrals in Athens
Greek Byzantine Catholic cathedrals
Churches completed in 1932